Flower Mound is an incorporated town located in Denton and Tarrant counties in the U.S. state of Texas. Located northwest of Dallas and northeast of Fort Worth adjacent to Grapevine Lake, the town derives its name from a prominent  mound located in the center of town.

After settlers used the site for religious camps during the 1840s, the area around Flower Mound was first permanently inhabited in the 1850s; however, residents did not incorporate until 1961. Although an effort to create a planned community failed in the early 1970s, Flower Mound's population increased substantially when Dallas/Fort Worth International Airport opened to the south in 1974. As of the 2020 United States census, the population was 75,956, reflecting a 17% increase over the 64,669 counted in the 2010 census. Of the Texas municipalities that label themselves "towns", Flower Mound has the largest population.  Flower Mound was the only town with a population greater than 20,000 in the 2020 census.

Flower Mound's municipal government, operating under a council–manager system, has invested in a public park system highlighted by an extensive network of trails. Lewisville Independent School District, which operates public schools, covers the majority of Flower Mound. With its moderately affluent population and proximity to the Dallas–Fort Worth metroplex, Flower Mound has used a smart growth system for urban planning, and has recently experienced more rapid light industrial growth to match the growing needs of the primarily residential community.

History
Settlement in the area around Flower Mound began when the Presbyterians established a camp in the area in the 1840s. A log cabin, dated around 1850, was discovered preserved within the walls of a home near Liberty Elementary in 2016, providing further proof of settlement. At first, the group held religious camps for two to three weeks at a time. By 1854, residents had established the Flower Mound Presbyterian Church southwest of Lewisville in an area commonly referred to as "Long Prairie". By 1920, the church had 126 members, and the pine-framed building was expanded in 1937. Early settlers such as Andrew Morriss and David Kirkpatrick are memorialized with street names in the town. The area remained sparsely populated for many decades after its initial settlement.

On February 25, 1961, the town voted to incorporate to avoid annexation by the City of Irving. William Wilkerson, who became the town's second mayor, led the incorporation effort and helped improve the town's phone service and water supply. In 1970, when Flower Mound had 1,685 residents, Edward S. Marcus and Raymond Nasher began a planned community project with $18 million in loan guarantees from the United States Department of Housing and Urban Development through their New Community program. Called "Flower Mound New Town", the project included elements of the new towns movement, including collaboration with North Texas State University (now the University of North Texas) to move the school's administrative offices to Flower Mound and conduct all research for the project. The project was featured in advertisements as late as 1974, but it was abandoned after residents threatened to disannex a portion of the town to thwart the development. The disannexation effort sharply divided the town, and led to a number of strongly contested elections between 1971 and 1976. In 1976, Texas Monthly awarded the project its "Bum Steer Award" after the project lost its federal loan guarantees.

Between 1980 and 1990, Flower Mound's population increased from 4,402 to 15,896. It reached 50,702 in 2000, an average annual increase of nearly 13 percent per year during the 1990s, making it the nation's tenth fastest-growing community. Between 2000 and 2002, Flower Mound was the ninth fastest-growing municipality in the United States with a population of more than 50,000, and its population continued to increase by approximately five percent each year between 2000 and 2005. Controlled growth continues in central and western Flower Mound.

Geography
The town is located almost entirely in Denton County, however it has areas that extend into Tarrant County. It is situated on the basin of the Trinity River in the Eastern Cross Timbers subregion in Texas. The town borders Lewisville to the east and a number of cities and towns to the north, including Highland Village, Double Oak, and Bartonville. Land comprises  (95.37%) of the total area; Denton County soils include the Silawa, Nawo, Gasil series. Water comprises  (5.76%) of the total area; Grapevine Lake and Marshall Creek form much of the town's southern boundary. Flower Mound's climate is classified as humid subtropical; the town averages 233 sunny days per year and 79 days of precipitation.

The town encourages conservation development projects to protect and preserve existing open space, vistas, and natural habitats while allowing for controlled growth. Much of the town is located on the Barnett Shale, and drilling for shale gas in close proximity to residential neighborhoods has sharply divided parts of the community. In 1994, amateur fossil collector Gary Byrd discovered a fossilized example of a Hadrosaurid dinosaur among black shale rock formations in the southwest edge of the town near Grapevine Lake. The fossilized creature from the Cenomanian age was named "Protohadros byrdi" in Byrd's honor.

“The Mound”
The formation attracted the attention of early settlers to the area, and is often simply referred to as "The Mound". Part of the Texas blackland prairies, The Mound is typically covered by big bluestem, little bluestem, and Indian grasses. During blooming seasons, dozens of varieties of flowers can grow on its slopes, often aided by the water retained by gilgai formations. Though surrounded by commercial and residential development, The Mound is owned and maintained by The Mound Foundation, a non-profit private–public partnership. The group has advocated for a controlled burn on The Mound for many years, and it expressed relief when an  accidental New Year's Eve fire in late 2011 spurred the growth of wildflowers for the first time in years.

Climate

Demographics

As of the 2010 United States census, there were 64,669 people and 14,269 families residing in 21,570 housing units in Flower Mound. As of the 2020 United States census, there were 75,956 people, 26,233 households, and 21,954 families residing in the town.

In 2010, the racial and ethnic makeup of the town was 83.9% White, 3.2% African American, 0.1% Native American, 8.6% Asian, 0.1% Pacific Islander, and 2.2% from two or more races. Hispanic or Latino of any race were 8.4% of the population. The average household size was 3.072 people. Among the population in 2020, the racial and ethnic makeup was 66.02% non-Hispanic white, 3.37% African American, 0.38% Native American, 14.09% Asian American, 0.04% Pacific Islander, 0.42% some other race, 4.56% multiracial, and 11.11% Hispanic or Latino of any race; these statistics reflected nationwide trends of demographic diversification.

According to a 2011 American Community Survey estimate, the median income for a household was $118,763, and the median income for a family was $126,336. Males had a median income of $95,284 versus $56,692 for females. The per capita income for the town was $44,042. About 2% of families and 3.4% of the population were below the poverty line, including 3.5% of those under age 18 and 1.1% of those age 65 or over.

The town's population is often noted for its moderately affluent, yet relatively transient residents. Although Flower Mound has the second-highest percentage of residents making over $100,000 in the nation, Journalist Peter T. Kilborn named Flower Mound a "Reloville", a title used to describe suburban communities where management employees often relocate frequently; as of 2006, 57% of residents were born in another state or country.

Economy
Due to the town's proximity to the DFW airport and many various major highways, a great number of businesses have recently moved some of their local operations into the town, including such businesses as: Best Buy and Stryker. The Lewisville Independent School District is the largest employer in the town, employing 1,647 (4.8% of the town's total employment). The Town of Flower Mound employs 455. Between January 1, 2000 and December 31, 2009, the town experienced job growth of 26.53%.

Notable businesses 
Adeptus Health was founded in 2002 with its first emergency room located in Flower Mound.

Lakeside Business District 
The town of Flower Mound recognizes two major areas of current economic development: the Lakeside Business District and the Denton Creek District. The  Lakeside Business District includes plots of land zoned for various commercial and residential uses at the southern edge of town near the Grapevine Lake. The project filed for bankruptcy in the year 2010, but in February of the year 2012, the company Realty Capital unveiled a $1 billion and two dollar plan for a mixed-use development project within the district. The members of the Flower Mound town council voted to approve the project in November of the year 2012, and development of the  project was scheduled in six phases. Construction on the first phase, which includes  of commercial space, 170 loft apartments, and 170 home lots, began in April 2013.

Denton Creek District 
In 2006, the town began to consider mixed-use development plans for the  Denton Creek District at the western edge of the town. In 2010, the town began to provide infrastructural support to the area. Additionally, developers broke ground on a  mixed-use riverwalk project in August 2013. Residents were scheduled to vote on whether to approve public funding for the district for the 2013 general election.

Parker Square 
The University of Las Colinas (2020) filmed at a shopping mall, the 2003 Society of American Registered Architects Design Award winning, David M. Schwarz Architects, Inc. designed, Parker Square, "a compact neighborhood center" "inspired by the traditional developments of American “main streets” and Texas small towns".

Top employers
According to Flower Mound's 2014 Comprehensive Annual Financial Report, the top employers in the town were:

Parks and recreation

In June 2008, the town held the grand opening for its new $13.825 million community activity center, which includes meeting rooms, a day care facility, weight lifting equipment, an outdoor pool, and a  competition indoor pool. In honor of Lance Corporal Jacob Lugo, the first military serviceman from Flower Mound to die in the line of duty, the town renamed Hilltop Park to Jake's Hilltop Park in 2008. jakes hilltop park is made up of baseball/ softball fields. 

In 2016 Flower Mound completed and opened its first dog park, a 5-acre Hound Mound Dog Park, costing over $1 million. In 2018 the Town of Flower Mound opened a 2000 sq. ft. splash pad as part of an addition to Heritage Park.

Trail system
In 1976, in response to environmental concerns and automobile traffic congestion, Flower Mound residents proposed adding a system of recreational bike paths around the town. Initially, funding proved elusive, but by 1989 the first  of multi-use trails had been constructed, partly funded by a grant from the Texas Parks and Wildlife Department. The Purple Cone Flower trail starts in Stone Creek Park and is used by runners, walkers and dog walkers and bikers.

The North Shore trail starts at Rock Ledge Park and travels west through Murrell Park and Twin Coves Park. (now owned by flower mound). A dirt and rock surface trail used predominantly by mountain bikers, hikers, trail runners and dog walkers.

Government
The Town of Flower Mound has been a home rule municipality since 1981, and it has operated under a council–manager type of municipal government since 1989. Residents elect five at-large members to the Flower Mound Town Council and one mayor. Members serve two-year terms. In 1999, the town adopted a Strategically Managed And Responsible Town (SMART) Growth Program to manage both the rate and character of development in the community, and in 2000, the town officially adopted its SMARTGrowth management plan. The program's goal was to create environmentally sensitive development and to mitigate the effects of urban sprawl. Political scientist Allan Saxe and attorney Terrence S. Welch have used Flower Mound's program as an example of a municipality attempting to slow growth. In 2013, the town amended the portion of the plan pertaining to public schools; the changes spurred public debate between candidates for town council.

According to the town's 2013–2014 Comprehensive Annual Financial Report, the town's various funds had $114.6 million in revenues, $101.8 million in expenditures, $513.3 million in total assets, $155.9 million in total liabilities, and $68.1 million in cash and investments.

The structure of the management and coordination of town services is led by a town manager, deputy town manager and other roles.

Education
The town is mostly served by the Lewisville Independent School District. Western portions of Flower Mound are divided between Argyle Independent School District, Denton Independent School District, and Northwest Independent School District.

The town is home to three separate high schools, Edward S. Marcus High School, Flower Mound High School, (both part of the Lewisville district) and Argyle ISDs new Argyle High School campus.

Private schools in the town include such educational facilities as:

 Coram Deo Academy
 Explorations Preparatory School
 Lewisville Christian School
 Grace Christian Academy
 Temple Christian Academy

ResponsiveEd, the Lewisville-based charter school operator, operates a Founders Classical Academy in Flower Mound; the company is building a new facility in west Flower Mound at FM1171 (Cross Timbers) and Flower Mound Road.

North Central Texas College has a community college branch campus within Parker Square in the town of Flower Mound. Midwestern State University has a branch facility, in conjunction with NCTC in the Parker Square location, which will offer master's degree programs amongst other services.

Infrastructure

Transportation
At the western edge of the town, U.S. Route 377 extends north–south parallel to Interstate 35W towards Denton and Fort Worth. Two of the major thoroughfares in the town of Flower Mound are farm-to-market roads: FM 1171, known in Flower Mound as the Cross Timbers Road, which runs east–west across the entire town towards Interstate 35E to the east and Interstate 35W to the west. FM 2499 (which is known locally as Long Prairie) runs north–south and furnishes access to State Highway 121 and Interstate 635, north of DFW Airport.

In the June 2012, the members of the Flower Mound Town Council approved a plan to develop and regulate a series of various bike lanes around the town.

In the year 2012, the National Motorists Association released a poll listing Flower Mound as the "worst speed trap city" in North America with a population of over 50,002. Locals say it is not one anymore.

Notable people 

 Kennedy Baker
 Chris Brown, hockey player
 Colleen Clinkenbeard
 Jameson Hannah
 Sarah Huffman
 Brandon Jefferson
 Moira Kelly
 Samuel LeComte
 Emma Malabuyo
 Jane Nelson
 Ryan Pace
 Rod Pampling
 Tan Parker
 Colin Poche, MLB pitcher
 Chris Sanders, quarterback 
 Brighton Sharbino
 Marcus Smart, NBA Player
 Kaden Smith
 Paul Stankowski
 Nick Stephens

Notes

Explanatory notes

Footnotes

Citations

General references

Academic articles

Books

Magazine articles

Maps

Newspaper articles

Reports

Websites

Further reading

External links

 Official Flower Mound Town Website
 Flower Mound Chamber of Commerce

 
Dallas–Fort Worth metroplex
Planned cities in the United States
Towns in Denton County, Texas
Towns in Tarrant County, Texas
Towns in Texas